Marko Milić may refer to:

 Marko Milič (born 1977), Slovenian basketball player
 Marko Milić (footballer) (born 1987), Serbian football player